America East Hockey League  was a Junior A league that folded in August 2008. The League had teams in the Northeastern region of the United States.

Its stated goal was to develops its players to play on college, Major Junior, and professional teams. America East was also the first Junior League affiliated with the North American Amateur Hockey Association (NAAHA).

League History
The league formed in 2005 with five member teams for the 2005–2006 season based in the Northeastern United States. The league expanded to 9 teams for the 2006-2007 season with teams based in the Northeastern and Mid-Atlantic regions of the US. The 2007–2008 season saw six teams in the AEHL after a few teams folded and the Eastern Penn Jr. Bucks announced the team would suspend operations for the season. Following the 2007–08 season the AEHL went through major changes when the Pennsylvania Enforcers, Delaware Thunder, and Wooster Oilers left the league to join the new United Junior Hockey League. After the three teams left the AEHL soon announced major expansion of the league into Canada. In May 2008 the AEHL announced four new teams from Quebec joined the AEHL for the upcoming 2008–2009 season. In August 2008 the league went dark. most of the teams have transferred to other independent Jr. hockey leagues.

2008–2009 Teams
 Dover Seawolves (2007–present)
 Eastern Penn Jr. Bucks (2006–present)
 Harrington College Icebergs (2005–present)
 Lionel-Groulx Nordiques (Sainte-Thérèse, Quebec) (2008 expansion)
 Saint Lawrence Lions (Ste-Foy, Quebec) (2008 expansion)
 Team Ulysee (La Plaine, Quebec (2008 expansion)
 Trois-Rivières (Trois-Rivières, Quebec) (2008 expansion)

Previous Teams
 Cleveland Training Development Program (2006–2007)
 Exeter Seawolves  (2005–2007) renamed Dover Seawolves (2007-2008)
 Long Island Rebels (2006–2008)
 Springfield Jr. Pics (2005–2006)
 South Jersey Raptors (2006–2008)
 New Jersey Ice Hoppers (2005–2007)
 Norwich Icebreakers (2005–2006)
 Pennsylvania Enforcers (2007–2008) moved to UJHL
 Delaware Thunder (2006–2008) moved to UJHL
 Wooster Oilers (2006–2008) moved to UJHL
 Lowell Raiders (2005–2006)

See also
List of ice hockey leagues

References

Defunct junior ice hockey leagues in the United States